Conrad Stephen Moll (November 27, 1899 – March 26, 1987) was an American football, basketball, and baseball coach.  He served as the head football, basketball and baseball coach at Valparaiso University during the 1926–27 academic year.  He continued coaching baseball Valparaiso in 1928.  Moll died on March 26, 1987, in Truth or Consequences, New Mexico.

Head coaching record

Football

References

External links
 

1899 births
1987 deaths
Valparaiso Beacons athletic directors
Valparaiso Beacons baseball coaches
Valparaiso Beacons football coaches
Valparaiso Beacons men's basketball coaches